Mattimeo is a fantasy novel by Brian Jacques, published in 1989. It is the third book in the Redwall series. It is also one of the three Redwall novels to be made into a television series, alongside its self-titled novel (Season 1) and "Martin the Warrior" (Season 3).

Plot summary

Slagar the Cruel
Mattimeo is a direct sequel to Redwall and Mossflower, taking place eight seasons (two years) after the events of the first novel. The peaceful woodland creatures of Redwall Abbey are busy preparing for a feast during the summer equinox. Matthias and Cornflower have had a son named Mattimeo, who has been generally spoiled throughout his life by the inhabitants of Redwall. Meanwhile, the masked fox Slagar the Cruel and his gang of slavers are planning to enter Redwall Abbey during one of their feasts. Slagar, a villainous fox craving revenge for a crime never committed against him, intends to capture slaves from Redwall and take them to an underground kingdom ruled by a mysterious, god-like figure named Malkariss to be sold as slaves. After drugging the Abbey residents, he kidnaps Mattimeo, Tim and Tess Churchmouse, Cynthia Bankvole, and Sam Squirrel. They meet Auma, (a young badger maid) and Jube, (a hedgehog), who were also kidnapped by Slagar the Cruel. Upon discovering the children missing, Matthias, Basil Stag Hare and Jess Squirrel with the help of a few friends, leave the Abbey to hunt down Slagar and return the children back home. They encounter Cheek, an ottercub Matthias describes as "Cheek both by name and by nature".

On their journey, they meet up with Orlando the Axe, the father of Auma, and Jabez Stump, the father of Jube. As they journey, they find the Guerrilla Union of Shrews in Mossflower (Guosim), and convince them to aid the travellers on their quest.

General Ironbeak
Meanwhile, at the Abbey, a horde of rooks, magpies, and crows led by General Ironbeak have come to conquer it. They instantly capture most of Redwall, starting from the top and working their way down. Then, Baby Rollo, Cornflower and Mrs. Churchmouse get kidnapped by the rooks, but the remaining Abbeydwellers manage to capture the Magpie brothers Quickbill, Diptail and Brightback with drugged strawberries, courtesy of Sister May. When the magpies went to forage for food for Ironbeak's crew, they ate the strawberries. The two forces then negotiate a hostage exchange. After that, the Abbey's residents take refuge in a basement called Cavern Hole, stocked with many supplies. Then Cornflower has an idea to dress up as a ghost and scare the rooks; they succeed, but General Ironbeak doesn't fall for the trick. He traps Constance in the gatehouse, then slips his army through the barricade.

Malkariss
After a long journey up cliffs, fighting a horde of archer rats, and crossing a desert and a gorge, Matthias's gang finally arrive at the underground kingdom of Malkariss, where Slagar has been trading his slaves. There, the heroes fight the massive army of rats, while Matthias frees the slaves held there and is reunited with his son. Then while they fight Matthias fights a large fiend called the Wearet and is thrown off a walkway into a pit where he confronts Malkariss who is revealed to be an ancient and somewhat repulsive polecat. Malkariss is about to kill Matthias with his own sword when the tyrant's slaves appear and destroy their master by pelting him with the stones and rocks which they had been using to build. Matthias frees the slaves and a great battle ensues during which Malkariss' kingdom is destroyed and his minions defeated. Later, Slagar reappears and kills Vitch, a rat slaver he worked with. Matthias and Orlando attempt to kill Slagar, who flees, only to plunge to his death down a well shaft.

The company return to Redwall after Stryk Redkite kills Ironbeak and his seer Mangiz and the woodlanders of Redwall send off the remaining ravens with iron collars around their necks.

The book ends with the residents of Redwall celebrating with a feast. Father Abbot declared the season Autumn of the Warriors' Return. The epilogue reveals that Tim had since become the abbey recorder (in an extract from his diary). Tess and Mattimeo had married, and Basil officially adopted Cheek (now bearing the title Cheek Stag Otter).

Characters in Mattimeo

Matthias
Cornflower
Mattimeo
Slagar the Cruel
Vitch
Tim and Tess Churchmouse
Cynthia Bankvole
Rollo Bankvole
Sam Squirrel
Mangiz
Auma
Cheek
Jubilation (Jube) Stump
Basil Stag Hare
Jess Squirrel
Orlando the Axe
Jabez Stump
Nadaz
Threeclaws
General Ironbeak
Stryk Redkite
Constance the Badger
Abbot Mordalfus
Sir Harry the Muse
John and Mrs Churchmouse
Grubclaw
Winifred the Otter
Halftail
Skinpaw
Scringe
Wedgeback
Snakespur
Fengal
Deadnose
Ambrose Spike
Mrs. Bankvole
Ragwing
Malkariss

Reception
Publishers Weekly said the book is a "truly thrilling conclusion" to the Redwall trilogy, and praised the characters as being "realistically drawn" and "full of personality". The Kirkus Reviews also offered some praise, calling it a "treat for Redwall's fans", but criticized its writing as being "wholly simplistic" and lacking depth.

Translations
(Dutch) Het Zuidland
Het Zuidland: Slagar de Wrede
Het Zuidland: De Kloof
Het Zuidland: Malkariss
(French) Rougemuraille : Mattiméo
Tome 1 : Salik le Barbare
Tome 2 : Le Général Becdacier
Tome 3 : Le Royaume du mal
(German) Mattimeo: Die Rache des Fuchses
Slagar der Grausame
General Eisenschnabel
Lord Malkariss
(Italian)
(Swedish)
Del 1: Slagar den Grymme
Del 2: General Järnnäbb
(Greek) Οι Γενναιοι: Του Ρεντγоυολ
(Latvian) Matimeo - Leģenda par Matiasa dēlu un Bendesmaisu Cietsirdi
Matimeo: Bendesmaiss Cietsirdis
Matimeo: Ģenerālis Dzelzsknābis
Matimeo: Malkariss

References

External links 
 Plot summary

Fictional mice and rats
Children's fantasy novels
British children's novels
British fantasy novels
Redwall books
1989 British novels
Hutchinson (publisher) books
1989 children's books
1989 fantasy novels
British novels adapted into television shows